= Stock in the Channel =

Vertical search engine

Stock in the Channel is an IT channel and website which is a vertical search engine for MSPs, IT resellers and VARs.

== History ==
Stock in the Channel was founded in 2009 by brothers Tony and Paul Meyers. It is headquartered in London, UK and has over 50,000 registered users.
